The Humboldt marten (Martes caurina humboldtensis) is an endangered, genetically distinct subspecies of the Pacific marten known from the old-growth coastal redwood forests, forests with dense shrub cover, areas with serpentine soils, and forested areas with dense understory cover of the U.S. states in coastal California and Oregon.

Habitat and distribution
Fewer than 500 of them survive in both states combined, in four different populations; one in northern California, one straddling the California-Oregon border, one in southern Oregon, and one in the Oregon Dunes National Recreation Area. It is speculated that Humboldt martens in northern California and southern Oregon may be genetically connected into one large population, but there is no data to inform genetic connectedness as of 2020.

Conservation
The subspecies was considered extinct until being rediscovered in the Six Rivers National Forest in 1996. They are most threatened by a lack of population expansion and by human-caused mortalities, including trapping and road mortality.

California banned all commercial trapping of martens since the 1950's, and Oregon banned trapping west of Interstate 5 in 2019. In California, the marten is threatened by the increasing number of marijuana farms destroying its habitat in the area. Humboldt martens were rated Endangered in California in 2019. Overall, the US Fish and Wildlife Service listed the Distinct Population Segment of coastal martens, synonymous with Humboldt martens, as Federally Threatened in 2020. Prior to 2020, there was confusion of the genetic composition of western marten subspecies.

Diet
Much is unknown regarding the Humboldt marten's diet, habitat requirements, and opportunities for restoration.  Research is ongoing and collaborative among entities.

References 

Endangered fauna of the United States
Martens
Taxa named by Joseph Grinnell